By 7:30 is the fifth album by Vonda Shepard, released on 20 April 1999. The album reached position #39 in the UK Albums Chart.

Track listing
All songs written and composed by Vonda Shepard, except track 8: lyrics by Shepard, music by Shepard and James Newton Howard.

Personnel 
 Vonda Shepard – lead vocals, acoustic piano (1, 3, 6-9, 12, 13), drum programming (1), acoustic guitar (2, 4, 10, 11), backing vocals (3, 4, 5, 7, 9, 10, 11, 13), electric acoustic guitar (5), Wurlitzer organ (9)
 Mitchell Froom – Moog bass (1), Indian harmonium (2), string arrangements (2, 12), keyboards (3, 10), acoustic piano (4), claviola (7, 12), Hammond B3 organ (8), harmonium (9), portative organ (9), optigan (11), "backwards" piano (11), ensemble arrangements (13)
 Charlie Guardino – accordion (13)
 Val McCallum – acoustic guitar (1, 7), 12-string guitar (2, 4), guitar (3), electric guitar (4, 5, 10, 11), guitars (9), balalaika (9), additional acoustic guitar (11)
 Greg Leisz – pedal steel guitar (7)
 Michael Landau – guitars (8)
 Tony Levin – "rubber band" bass (1), bass (3, 9, 10)
 Leland Sklar – bass (2, 7, 8)
 Davey Faragher – bass (4, 8)
 Jim Hanson – bass (5, 11)
 Penny Owsley – bass (11)
 Andy Kamman – drums (2), additional drums (7), percussion (7)
 Jerry Marotta – percussion (1, 10), drums (10)
 Pete Thomas – percussion (2, 8), drums (3, 5, 7, 8, 9, 11), drum loops (3)
 Aaron Heick – clarinet (13)
 Garo Yellin – cello (1, 12, 13)
 Jane Scarpantoni – cello (2, 12)
 David Gold – viola (2, 12)
 Matthew Pierce – viola (2, 12)
 Mark Feldman — violin (2, 12)
 Lorenza Ponce – violin (2, 12)
 Emily Saliers – lead vocals (8)

Production 
 Vonda Shepard – producer 
 Mitchell Froom – producer 
 S. Husky Hoskulds – engineer 
 John Paterno – engineer 
 Paul Dieter – additional engineer 
 Nathaniel Kunkel – additional engineer 
 Greg Burns – assistant engineer 
 Juan Garcia – assistant engineer 
 John Nelson – assistant engineer 
 Josh Turner – assistant engineer 
 Mark Willsher – assistant engineer 
 Bob Clearmountain – mixing 
 David Boucher – mix assistant 
 Julie Larson – album coordinator 
 Ria Lewerke – art direction, design 
 Norman Moore – art direction, design
 Gerry Wenner – photography 
 Stephanie Wolf – stylist 
 Brett Freedman – hair, makeup 
 Gail Gellman – management 

Studios
 Recorded at Ocean Way Recording, Conway Studios and The Sound Factory (Hollywood, California); The Magic Shop (New York City, New York).
 Mixed at Mix This! (Los Angeles, California).

Charts

References
[ allmusic: By 7:30]

1999 albums
Vonda Shepard albums
Albums produced by Mitchell Froom